The Dravidian languages (sometimes called Dravidic) are a family of languages spoken by 250 million people, mainly in southern India, north-east Sri Lanka, and south-west Pakistan. Since the colonial era, there have been small but significant immigrant communities of speakers of those languages in Mauritius, Myanmar, Singapore, Malaysia, Indonesia, Philippines, United Kingdom, Australia, France, Canada, Germany, South Africa, and the United States.

The Dravidian languages are first attested in the 2nd century BCE, as Tamil-Brahmi script, inscribed on the cave walls in the Madurai and Tirunelveli districts of Tamil Nadu. The Dravidian languages with the most speakers are (in descending order of number of speakers) Telugu, Tamil, Kannada and Malayalam, all of which have long literary traditions. Smaller literary languages are Tulu and Kodava. There are also a number of Dravidian-speaking scheduled tribes, such as the Kurukh in Eastern India and Gondi in Central India.

Outside of India, Brahui is mostly spoken in the Balochistan region of Pakistan, as well as other smaller groups of speakers in Irani Balochistan, Afghanistan and around the Marw oasis in Turkmenistan.
Dhangar, a dialect of Kurukh, is spoken in parts of Nepal, Bhutan and Bangladesh.
Tamil is spoken in north-eastern Sri Lanka.
There are also Dravidian-speaking diaspora communities in the Middle East, Europe, North America and South East Asia.

Dravidian place names along the Arabian Sea coast and Dravidian grammatical influence such as clusivity in the Indo-Aryan languages, namely, Marathi, Gujarati, Marwari, and Sindhi, suggest that Dravidian languages were spoken more widely across the Indian subcontinent before the spread of the Indo-Aryan languages. Though some scholars have argued that the Dravidian languages may have been brought to India by migrations from the Iranian plateau in the fourth or third millennium BCE or even earlier, reconstructed proto-Dravidian vocabulary suggests that the family is indigenous to India.
Despite many attempts, the family has not been shown to be related to any other.

Dravidian studies 

The 14th-century Sanskrit text Lilatilakam, a grammar of Manipravalam, states that the spoken languages of present-day Kerala and Tamil Nadu were similar, terming them as "Dramiḍa". The author does not consider the "Karṇṇāṭa" (Kannada) and the "Andhra" (Telugu) languages as "Dramiḍa", because they were very different from the language of the "Tamil Veda" (Tiruvaymoli), but states that some people would include them in the "Dramiḍa" category.

In 1816, Alexander D. Campbell and Francis W. Ellis argued that Tamil, Telugu, Kannada, Malayalam, Tulu and Kodava descended from a common, non-Indo-European ancestor. In 1856, Robert Caldwell published his Comparative Grammar of the Dravidian or South-Indian Family of Languages, which considerably expanded the Dravidian umbrella and established Dravidian as one of the major language groups of the world.

In 1961, T. Burrow and M. B. Emeneau published the Dravidian Etymological Dictionary, with a major revision in 1984.

Name

Caldwell coined the term "Dravidian" for this family of languages, based on the usage of the Sanskrit word  in the work Tantravārttika by :

The origin of the Sanskrit word  is the Tamil word . The -m-/-v- alternation is a common enough phenomenon in Dravidian phonology".

Bhadriraju Krishnamurti states in his reference book The Dravidian languages: 

Classification
The Dravidian languages form a close-knit family. Most scholars agree on four groups: South (or South DravidianI), South-Central (or South DravidianII), Central, and North Dravidian, but there are different proposals regarding the relationship between these groups. Earlier classifications grouped Central and South-Central Dravidian in a single branch. On the other hand, Krishnamurti groups South-Central and South Dravidian together.

 South Dravidian (or South DravidianI)
 Tamil–Kannada
 
 
 
 
 
 Tamil languages, including Tamil
 Malayalam languages, including Malayalam
 Irula
 
 Kodava
 Kurumba
 Toda
 Kota
 Kannada languages
 Kannada
 Badaga 
 
 Koraga
 Tulu
 Kudiya

 South-Central Dravidian (or South DravidianII)
 
 Telugu
 Chenchu
 Gondi-Kui
 Gondi languages, including Gondi
 
 
 Konda
 Mukha-Dora
 
 
 Manda
 Pengo
 
 Kuvi
 Kui

 Central Dravidian
 
 Kolami
 Naiki
 
 Gadaba
 Ollari
 Kondekor
 Duruwa

 North Dravidian
 Kurukh–Malto
 Kurukh (Oraon, Kisan)
 Malto (Kumarbhag Paharia, Sauria Paharia)
 Brahui

Some authors deny that North Dravidian forms a valid subgroup, splitting it into Northeast (Kurukh–Malto) and Northwest (Brahui). Their affiliation has been proposed based primarily on a small number of common phonetic developments, including:
This development is, however, also found in several other Dravidian languages, including Kannada, Kodagu and Tulu.
McAlpin (2003) notes that no exact conditioning can be established for the first two changes, and proposes that distinct Proto-Dravidian *q and *kʲ should be reconstructed behind these correspondences, and that Brahui, Kurukh-Malto, and the rest of Dravidian may be three coordinate branches, possibly with Brahui being the earliest language to split off. A few morphological parallels between Brahui and Kurukh-Malto are also known, but according to McAlpin they are analyzable as shared archaisms rather than shared innovations.

In addition, Ethnologue lists several unclassified Dravidian languages: Allar, Bazigar, Bharia, Malankuravan (possibly a dialect of Malayalam), and Vishavan. Ethnologue also lists several unclassified South Dravidian languages: Mala Malasar, Malasar, Thachanadan, Ullatan, Kalanadi, Kumbaran, Kunduvadi, Kurichiya, Attapady Kurumba, Muduga, Pathiya, and Wayanad Chetti.
Pattapu may also be South Dravidian.

A computational phylogenetic study of the Dravidian language family was undertaken by Kolipakam, et al. (2018). Kolipakam, et al. (2018) supports the internal coherence of the four Dravidian branches South (or South Dravidian I), South-Central (or South Dravidian II), Central, and North, but is uncertain about the precise relationships of these four branches to each other. The date of Dravidian is estimated to be 4,500 years old.

Distribution
Since 1981, the Census of India has reported only languages with more than 10,000 speakers, including 17 Dravidian languages. In 1981, these accounted for approximately 24% of India's population.
In the 2001 census, they included 214 million people, about 21% of India's total population of 1.02 billion. In addition, the largest Dravidian-speaking group outside India, Tamil speakers in Sri Lanka, number around 4.7 million. The total number of speakers of Dravidian languages is around 227 million people, around 13% of the population of the Indian subcontinent.

The largest group of the Dravidian languages is South Dravidian, with almost 150 million speakers. Tamil, Kannada and Malayalam make up around 98% of the speakers, with 75 million, 44 million and 37 million native speakers, respectively.

The next-largest is the South-Central branch, which has 78 million native speakers, the vast majority of whom speak Telugu. The total number of speakers of Telugu, including those whose first language is not Telugu, is around 84 million people. This branch also includes the tribal language Gondi spoken in central India.

The second-smallest branch is the Northern branch, with around 6.3 million speakers. This is the only sub-group to have a language spoken in Pakistan — Brahui.

The smallest branch is the Central branch, which has only around 200,000 speakers. These languages are mostly tribal, and spoken in central India.

Languages recognized as official languages of India appear here in boldface.

Proposed relations with other families

The Dravidian family has defied all of the attempts to show a connection with other languages, including Indo-European, Hurrian, Basque, Sumerian, Korean, and Japanese. Comparisons have been made not just with the other language families of the Indian subcontinent (Indo-European, Austroasiatic, Sino-Tibetan, and Nihali), but with all typologically similar language families of the Old World. Nonetheless, although there are no readily detectable genealogical connections, Dravidian shares several areal features with the Indo-Aryan languages, which have been attributed to the influence of a Dravidian substratum on Indo-Aryan.

Dravidian languages display typological similarities with the Uralic language group, and there have been several attempts to establish a genetic relationship in the past. This idea has been popular amongst Dravidian linguists, including Robert Caldwell, Thomas Burrow, Kamil Zvelebil, and Mikhail Andronov, The hypothesis is, however, rejected by most specialists in Uralic languages, and also in recent times by Dravidian linguists such as Bhadriraju Krishnamurti.

In the early 1970s, the linguist David McAlpin produced a detailed proposal of a genetic relationship between Dravidian and the extinct Elamite language of ancient Elam (present-day southwestern Iran). The Elamo-Dravidian hypothesis was supported in the late 1980s by the archaeologist Colin Renfrew and the geneticist Luigi Luca Cavalli-Sforza, who suggested that Proto-Dravidian was brought to India by farmers from the Iranian part of the Fertile Crescent. (In his 2000 book, Cavalli-Sforza suggested western India, northern India and northern Iran as alternative starting points.) However, linguists have found McAlpin's cognates unconvincing and criticized his proposed phonological rules as ad hoc. Elamite is generally believed by scholars to be a language isolate, and the theory has had no effect on studies of the language. In 2012, Southworth suggested a "Zagrosian family" of West Asian origin including Elamite, Brahui and Dravidian as its three branches.

Dravidian is one of the primary language families in the Nostratic proposal, which would link most languages in North Africa, Europe and Western Asia into a family with its origins in the Fertile Crescent sometime between the Last Glacial Period and the emergence of Proto-Indo-European 4,000–6,000 BCE. However, the general consensus is that such deep connections are not, or not yet, demonstrable.

Prehistory
The origins of the Dravidian languages, as well as their subsequent development and the period of their differentiation are unclear, partially due to the lack of comparative linguistic research into the Dravidian languages. It is thought that the Dravidian languages were the most widespread indigenous languages in the Indian subcontinent before the advance of the Indo-Aryan languages. Though some scholars have argued that the Dravidian languages may have been brought to India by migrations from the Iranian plateau in the fourth or third millennium BCE or even earlier, reconstructed proto-Dravidian vocabulary suggests that the family is indigenous to India.

Proto-Dravidian and onset of diversification
As a proto-language, the Proto-Dravidian language is not itself attested in the historical record. Its modern conception is based solely on reconstruction. It was suggested in the 1980s that the language was spoken in the 4th millennium BCE, and started disintegrating into various branches around the 3rd millennium BCE. According to Krishnamurti, Proto-Dravidian may have been spoken in the Indus civilization, suggesting a "tentative date of Proto-Dravidian around the early part of the third millennium." Krishnamurti further states that South Dravidian I (including pre-Tamil) and South Dravidian II (including Pre-Telugu) split around the 11th century BCE, with the other major branches splitting off at around the same time. Kolipakam et al. (2018) give a similar estimate of 2,500 BCE for Proto-Dravidian.

Several geneticists have noted a strong correlation between Dravidian and the Ancestral South Indian (ASI) component of South Asian genetic makeup. Narasimhan et al. (2019) argue that the ASI component itself formed in the early 2nd millennium BCE from a mixture of a population associated with the Indus Valley civilization and a population resident in peninsular India. They conclude that one of these two groups may have been the source of proto-Dravidian.
An Indus valley origin would be consistent with the location of Brahui and with attempts to interpret the Indus script as Dravidian. On the other hand, reconstructed Proto-Dravidian terms for flora and fauna provide support for a peninsular Indian origin.

Indus Valley Civilisation
The Indus Valley civilisation (3,300–1,900 BCE), located in the Indus Valley region, is sometimes suggested to have been Dravidian. Already in 1924, after discovering the Indus Valley Civilisation, John Marshall stated that (one of) the language(s) may have been Dravidic. Cultural and linguistic similarities have been cited by researchers Henry Heras, Kamil Zvelebil, Asko Parpola and Iravatham Mahadevan as being strong evidence for a proto-Dravidian origin of the ancient Indus Valley civilisation. The discovery in Tamil Nadu of a late Neolithic (early 2nd millennium BCE, i.e. post-dating Harappan decline) stone celt allegedly marked with Indus signs has been considered by some to be significant for the Dravidian identification.

Yuri Knorozov surmised that the symbols represent a logosyllabic script and suggested, based on computer analysis, an underlying agglutinative Dravidian language as the most likely candidate for the underlying language. Knorozov's suggestion was preceded by the work of Henry Heras, who suggested several readings of signs based on a proto-Dravidian assumption.

Linguist Asko Parpola writes that the Indus script and Harappan language are "most likely to have belonged to the Dravidian family". Parpola led a Finnish team in investigating the inscriptions using computer analysis. Based on a proto-Dravidian assumption, they proposed readings of many signs, some agreeing with the suggested readings of Heras and Knorozov (such as equating the "fish" sign with the Dravidian word for fish, "min") but disagreeing on several other readings. A comprehensive description of Parpola's work until 1994 is given in his book Deciphering the Indus Script.

Northern Dravidian pockets

Although in modern times speakers of the various Dravidian languages have mainly occupied the southern portion of India, in earlier times they probably were spoken in a larger area. After the Indo-Aryan migrations into north-western India, starting ca. 1500 BCE, and the establishment of the Kuru kingdom ca. 1100 BCE, a process of Sanskritisation of the masses started, which resulted in a language shift in northern India. Southern India has remained majority Dravidian, but pockets of Dravidian can be found in central India, Pakistan, Bangladesh and Nepal.

The Kurukh and Malto are pockets of Dravidian languages in central India, spoken by people who may have migrated from south India. They do have myths about external origins. The Kurukh have traditionally claimed to be from the Deccan Peninsula, more specifically Karnataka. The same tradition has existed of the Brahui, who call themselves immigrants. Holding this same view of the Brahui are many scholars such as L.H. Horace Perera and M.Ratnasabapathy.

The Brahui population of Pakistan's Balochistan province has been taken by some as the linguistic equivalent of a relict population, perhaps indicating that Dravidian languages were formerly much more widespread and were supplanted by the incoming Indo-Aryan languages. However, it has been argued that the absence of any Old Iranian (Avestan) loanwords in Brahui suggests that the Brahui migrated to Balochistan from central India less than 1,000 years ago. The main Iranian contributor to Brahui vocabulary, Balochi, is a western Iranian language like Kurdish, and arrived in the area from the west only around 1000 CE. Sound changes shared with Kurukh and Malto also suggest that Brahui was originally spoken near them in central India.

Dravidian influence on Sanskrit

Dravidian languages show extensive lexical (vocabulary) borrowing, but only a few traits of structural (either phonological or grammatical) borrowing from Indo-Aryan, whereas Indo-Aryan shows more structural than lexical borrowings from the Dravidian languages. Many of these features are already present in the oldest known Indo-Aryan language, the language of the Rigveda (c.1500 BCE), which also includes over a dozen words borrowed from Dravidian.

Vedic Sanskrit has retroflex consonants (/) with about 88 words in the Rigveda having unconditioned retroflexes.
Since other Indo-European languages, including other Indo-Iranian languages, lack retroflex consonants, their presence in Indo-Aryan is often cited as evidence of substrate influence from close contact of the Vedic speakers with speakers of a foreign language family rich in retroflex consonants. The Dravidian family is a serious candidate since it is rich in retroflex phonemes reconstructible back to the Proto-Dravidian stage.

In addition, a number of grammatical features of Vedic Sanskrit not found in its sister Avestan language appear to have been borrowed from Dravidian languages. These include the gerund, which has the same function as in Dravidian. Some linguists explain this asymmetrical borrowing by arguing that Middle Indo-Aryan languages were built on a Dravidian substratum. These scholars argue that the most plausible explanation for the presence of Dravidian structural features in Indic is language shift, that is, native Dravidian speakers learning and adopting Indic languages due to elite dominance. Although each of the innovative traits in Indic could be accounted for by internal explanations, early Dravidian influence is the only explanation that can account for all of the innovations at once; moreover, it accounts for several of the innovative traits in Indic better than any internal explanation that has been proposed.

Grammar
The most characteristic grammatical features of Dravidian languages are:
 Dravidian languages are agglutinative.
 Word order is subject–object–verb (SOV).
 Most Dravidian languages have a clusivity distinction.
 The major word classes are nouns (substantives, numerals, pronouns), adjectives, verbs, and indeclinables (particles, enclitics, adverbs, interjections, onomatopoetic words, echo words).
 Proto-Dravidian used only suffixes, never prefixes or infixes, in the construction of inflected forms. Hence, the roots of words always occurred at the beginning. Nouns, verbs, and indeclinable words constituted the original word classes.
 There are two numbers and four different gender systems, the ancestral system probably having "male:non-male" in the singular and "person:non-person" in the plural.
 In a sentence, however complex, only one finite verb occurs, normally at the end, preceded if necessary by a number of gerunds.
 Word order follows certain basic rules but is relatively free.
 The main (and probably original) dichotomy in tense is past:non-past. Present tense developed later and independently in each language or subgroup.
 Verbs are intransitive, transitive, and causative; there are also active and passive forms.
 All of the positive verb forms have their corresponding negative counterparts, negative verbs.

Phonology

Dravidian languages are noted for the lack of distinction between aspirated and unaspirated stops. While some Dravidian languages have accepted large numbers of loanwords from Sanskrit and other Indo-Iranian languages in addition to their already vast vocabulary, in which the orthography shows distinctions in voice and aspiration, the words are pronounced in Dravidian according to different rules of phonology and phonotactics: aspiration of plosives is generally absent, regardless of the spelling of the word. This is not a universal phenomenon and is generally avoided in formal or careful speech, especially when reciting. For instance, Tamil does not distinguish between voiced and voiceless stops. In fact, the Tamil alphabet lacks symbols for voiced and aspirated stops. Dravidian languages are also characterized by a three-way distinction between dental, alveolar, and retroflex places of articulation as well as large numbers of liquids.

Proto-Dravidian

Proto-Dravidian had five short and long vowels: *a, *ā, *i, *ī, *u, *ū, *e, *ē, *o, *ō. There were no diphthongs; ai and au are treated as *ay and *av (or *aw).
The five-vowel system with phonemic length is largely preserved in the descendant subgroups, but there are some notable exceptions. The Nilgiri languages (except Kota but including Kodagu) developing a series of central vowels which formed from vowels near retroflex and alveolar consonants. The short u phonemes (mostly word finally) became ŭ/ụ and also became phonemic in Tulu and Malayalam, mostly caused by loaning. Brahui has slightly poorer vowel system, with e and o are always pronounced long.

The following consonantal phonemes are reconstructed:

Numerals

The numerals from 1 to 10 in various Dravidian and Indo-Aryan languages (here exemplified by Indo Aryan language Sanskrit and Iranian language Persian).
 

 This is the same as the word for another form of the number one in Tamil and Malayalam, used as the indefinite article ("a") and when the number is an attribute preceding a noun (as in "one person"), as opposed to when it is a noun (as in "How many are there?" "One").
 The stem *īr is still found in compound words, and has taken on a meaning of "double" in Tamil, Telugu, Kannada and Malayalam. For example, irupatu (20, literally meaning "double-ten"), iravai (20 in Telugu), "iraṭṭi" ("double") or iruvar ("two people", in Tamil) and "ippattu" (ipp-hattu, double ten", in Kannada).
 The Kolami numbers 5 to 10 are borrowed from Telugu.
 The word toṇṭu was also used to refer to the number nine in ancient Sangam texts but was later completely replaced by the word oṉpatu.
 These forms are derived from "one (less than) ten". Proto-Dravidian *toḷ/*toṇ (which could mean 9 or 9/10) is still used in Tamil and Malayalam as the basis of numbers such as 90 and 900, toṇṇūṟu (*100 = 90) as well as the Kannada tombattu (9*10 = 90).
 Because of shared sound changes that have happened over the years in the majority of the Tamil dialects, the numbers 1-5 have different colloquial pronunciations, seen here to the right of their written, formal pronunciations.
 In languages with words for one starts with ok(k)- it was taken from *okk- which originally meant "to be united" and not a numeral.
 Words indicated (II) are borrowings from Indo-Iranian languages (in Brahui's case, from Balochi).

Literature

Four Dravidian languages, viz. Tamil, Kannada, Telugu and Malayalam, have lengthy literary traditions.
Literature in Tulu and Kodava is more recent. Recently old literature in Gondi has been discovered as well.

The earliest known Dravidian inscriptions are 76 Old Tamil inscriptions on cave walls in Madurai and Tirunelveli districts in Tamil Nadu, dating from the 2nd century BCE.
These inscriptions are written in a variant of the Brahmi script called Tamil Brahmi.
In 2019, the Tamil Nadu Archaeology Department released a report on excavations at Keeladi, near Madurai, Tamil Nadu, including a description of potsherds dated to the 6th century BCE inscribed with personal names in the Tamil-Brahmi script.
However, the report lacks the detail of a full archaeological study, and other archaeologists have disputed whether the oldest dates obtained for the site can be assigned to these potsherds.
The earliest long text in Old Tamil is the Tolkāppiyam, a work on Tamil grammar and poetics preserved in a 5th-century CE redaction, whose oldest layers could date from the late 2nd century or 1st century BCE.

Kannada's earliest known inscription is the lion balustrade (Simhakatanjana) inscription excavated at the Pranaveshwara temple complex at Talagunda near Shiralakoppa of Shivamogga district, dated to 370 CE which replaced the Halmidi inscription in Hassan district (450 CE). A 9th-century treatise on poetics, the Kavirajamarga, is the first known literary work.
The earliest Telugu inscription, from Erragudipadu in Kadapa district, is dated 575. The first literary work is an 11th-century translation of part of the Mahābhārata.
The earliest Malayalam text is the Vazhappally copper plate (9th century). The first literary work is Rāmacaritam (12th century).

See also
 Dravidian Linguistics Association
 Dravidian peoples
 Dravidian nationalism
 Tamil loanwords in Biblical Hebrew
 Dreaming of Words

Notes

References

Bibliography

 
 
 ; Reprinted London, K. Paul, Trench, Trubner & co., ltd., 1913; rev. ed. by J.L. Wyatt and T. Ramakrishna Pillai, Madras, University of Madras, 1961, reprint Asian Educational Services, 1998, .

Further reading
 Vishnupriya Kolipakam et al. (2018), A Bayesian phylogenetic study of the Dravidian language family, Royal Society Open Science.

External links

 Dravidian Etymological Dictionary. Burrow and Emeneau's A Dravidian etymological dictionary (2nd ed., 1984) in a searchable online form.

 
Language families
Agglutinative languages
Pre-Indo-Europeans